The 1985–86 season was Port Vale's 74th season of football in the English Football League, and second successive (13th overall) season in the Fourth Division. John Rudge achieved his first success as manager, leading Vale to promotion into the Third Division with a fourth-place finish. The club also reached the Second Round in both the FA Cup and League Cup, as well as the Northern Section Semi-Finals of the Associate Members' Cup. Rudge signing Andy Jones excelled to become the club's top-scorer, whilst Robbie Earle had another impressive season. However the promotion campaign was built on the strength of the Vale defence, and goalkeeper Jim Arnold was made Player of the Year.

Overview

Fourth Division
The pre-season saw John Rudge sign big defender John Williams from Tranmere Rovers for £12,000, and powerful Welsh striker Andy Jones from Northern Premier League side Rhyl for £3,000. He also signed goalkeeper Jim Arnold (Everton); Paul Maguire (Tacoma Stars); Jeff Johnson (Gillingham); and Wayne Ebanks (West Bromwich Albion). Meanwhile, new safety regulations reduced Vale Park's capacity down to 16,800, and later again to 16,300. The club set a £10 bonus for clean sheets and also set bonuses for promotion. Another late addition was Jon Bowden from Oldham Athletic for £5,000.

The season opened with a 1–0 defeat to Exeter City at St James Park. Vale continued on indifferent form, and on 17 September played out a goalless draw with Aldershot at the Recreation Ground's lowest recorded Football League attendance of 1,027. At the end of the month Vale went nine league games without a loss to fire the club into the promotion race, their run including three 4–0 wins in Burslem as they went clear at the top of the table. With John Williams sidelined with an ankle injury, Vale's form suffered with just two wins in the following eleven games, and Vale fell to fifth place. From 11 January to 26 April the "Valiants" hit a run of eighteen league games unbeaten (eight draws and ten wins), thus ensuring promotion. This run was built on the striking partnership of Robbie Earle and Andy Jones, as well as a solid defence and consistent displays from keeper Arnold. During this spell Rudge failed to re-sign Bob Newton from Chesterfield, though was cheered by completing the double over Dario Gradi's Crewe Alexandra at Gresty Road. One low point was an attack by a Stockport gang on Russell Bromage following a 2–1 win over Stockport County at Edgeley Park. Promotion was ensured with a comfortable 1–0 win over bottom club Torquay United at Plainmoor, in which the majority of the crowd were Vale fans. However, with two defeats and a draw in their final three games, Rudge accused his players of lacking professionalism as they lost the chance to head into the Third Division as runners-up.

They finished in fourth place with 79 points, seven points clear of Orient. Preston North End were the only team to beat Vale on their own ground in the league all season. Their 37 goals conceded was the lowest total in the division and a record excelled only by Manchester United in the First Division. Their 67 goals scored tally was not particularly impressive, though Earle and Jones' partnership provided almost half of these goals. Phil Sproson was selected for the PFA Fourth Division Team of the Year.

Finances
On the financial side, the season lost a disastrous sum of £79,474. The promotion bonuses meant the wage bill totalled at £413,471. Vale's average home attendance of 3,581 was the third-highest in the division. The club's shirt sponsors were ECI. Three players transferred at the end of the season were Peter Griffiths (Salisbury United), Chris Pearce (Wrexham), and Jeff Johnson (Barrow). Player of the Year Jim Arnold and Ally Brown retired, whilst Oshor Williams was sold to Preston North End for 'a small fee'.

Cup competitions
In the FA Cup, Vale beat Mansfield Town 1–0 in a replay following a 1–1 draw at Field Mill. Vale Park saw a crowd of 11,736 for the Second Round goalless tie with Walsall, and were then eliminated following a 2–1 defeat at the Bescot Stadium.

In the League Cup, Vale advanced past Third Division Wigan Athletic 3–2 on aggregate following at 2–0 win at Springfield Park. They were then knocked out by First Division West Bromwich Albion, losing 1–0 at The Hawthorns, before giving an excellent account of themselves by battling back from 2–0 down at Vale Park to draw 2–2.

In the Associate Members' Cup, Vale advanced through the group stage with a 1–1 draw with Wrexham at the Racecourse Ground and a 2–0 home win over Blackpool. The next stage saw Vale triumph over Scunthorpe United at Glanford Park with a 4–3 win on penalties following a 1–1 draw. In the Area Semi-Finals they were then defeated by holders Wigan Athletic, though still earned £1,250 in prize money.

League table

Results
Port Vale's score comes first

Football League Fourth Division

Results by matchday

Matches

FA Cup

League Cup

Associate Members' Cup

Player statistics

Appearances

Top scorers

Transfers

Transfers in

Transfers out

Loans in

References
Specific

General

Port Vale F.C. seasons
Port Vale